The Boise Braves were a minor league baseball team in the western United States, based in Boise, Idaho. They played in the Pioneer League from 1955 to 1963 as an affiliate of the Milwaukee Braves. The team played at the Class C level for all but their final year, when they played at the Class A level. Their home venue was Braves Field, which had previously been called Joe Devine Airway Park.

History
The team was previously known as the unaffiliated Boise Pilots from 1939 to 1951 (except for three years during World War II when the league did not operate), then the Boise Yankees in 1952 and 1953, and the Pilots again in 1954. As a Milwaukee affiliate for nine seasons, the Boise Braves won three championships, and reached the league finals two other seasons. After the Boise Braves' final season of 1963, the ballpark was demolished, and Boise was without a minor league team until the Boise A's of the Northwest League debuted in 1975.

Season records

 The league did not hold playoffs in 1956; the Braves became champions by finishing first in league standings.

All-stars

Notable players
Sandy Alomar Sr.
Clay Carroll
Tony Cloninger
Bill Lucas
Bob Uecker

See also
Boise Braves players

References

External links
Baseball Reference – Boise teams

Baseball teams established in 1955
Defunct Pioneer League (baseball) teams
Professional baseball teams in Idaho
Milwaukee Braves minor league affiliates
1955 establishments in Idaho
1963 disestablishments in Idaho
Baseball teams disestablished in 1963
Sports in Boise, Idaho
Defunct baseball teams in Idaho